This is a list of political families in the Indian states of Andhra Pradesh and Telangana.

Alla family 
 Alla Ayodhya Rami Reddy Rajhya Sabha Member.
 Alla Ramakrishna Reddy - MLA from Mangalagiri (Assembly constituency)
 Modugula Venugopala Reddy - Lok Sabha Member Narsaraopeta & MLA from Guntur West (Assembly constituency)

Anipireddy family 
 Anipireddy Venkata Praveen Kumar Reddy MLA 
 Anipireddy Venkata Lakshmi Devamma - MLA

Botsa family
 Botsa Satyanarayana from Cheepurupalli (Assembly constituency)
 Botsa Jhansi Lakshmi, Vizianagaram (Lok Sabha constituency)
 Appalanarasayya Botcha, from Gajapathinagaram (Assembly constituency)

Bhuma family 
 Bhuma Shekar Reddy MLA from Allagadda.
 Bhuma Nagireddy - Lok Sabha Member from Nandyala & MLA from Allagadda & Nandyala.
 Shobha Nagi Reddy - MLA from Allagadda.
 Bhuma Akhila Priya - MLA from Allagadda & State Minister.
 Bhuma Brahmananda Reddy - MLA from Nandyala.
 S.V. Subba Reddy - MLA from Pattikonda & State Minister.
 S. V. Mohan Reddy - MLA from Kurnool & MLC.

Byreddy family 
 Byreddy Sesha Sayana Reddy - MLA from Nandikotkur & State Minister
 Byreddy Rajasekhar Reddy - MLA from Nandikotkur & State Minister

Devineni family 
Devineni Nehru, MLA of Kankipadu assembly constituency & State Minister.
Devineni Avinash, contesting from Gudivada assembly constituency in 2019 assembly elections of Andhra Pradesh and son of Devineni Nehru (Devineni Rajasekhar).
Devineni Uma Maheswara Rao, MLA of Mylavaram assembly constituency & State Minister.
Devineni Venkata Ramana, MLA of Nandigama (Assembly constituency) & State Minister.

Galla family 
 Galla Aruna Kumari MLA from Chandragiri & State Minister.
 Galla Jayadev - Lok Sabha Member from Guntur.

Gouthu family 
 Gouthu Syam Sunder Sivaji MLA from Palasa
 Gouthu Latchanna - Lok Sabha Member, MLA & Opposition Leader in AP Assembly.

Ganta family 
 Ganta Srinivasa Rao MLA , State Minister & Lok Sabha Member
 Ponguru Narayana MLC & State Minister
 Pulaparthi Ramanjaneyulu MLA from Bhimavaram (Assembly constituency).

J. C. family 
 J.C. Nagi Reddy  Rajhya Sabha Member
 J. C. Diwakar Reddy - MLA, State Minister & Lok Sabha Member
 J. C. Prabhakar Reddy - MLA from Tadpatri (Assembly constituency)
 G. Deepak Reddy - MLC

Kalvakuntla family
K. Chandrashekar Rao, first and current chief minister of Telangana
K. T. Rama Rao, Son of K. Chandrashekar Rao and Cabinet Minister for Panchayat Raj & IT, Telangana
K. Kavitha, Member of Parliament, Nizamabad and MLC
T. Harish Rao nephew K. Chandrashekhar Rao and Cabinet Minister for Irrigation, Marketing & Legislative Affairs for Telangana state
Joginapally Santosh Kumar Cousin of KTR, Rajhya Sabha Member

Kasu family
Kasu Brahmananda Reddy, CM of Andhra Pradesh. Central Home Minister, Governor
Kasu Krishna Reddy, Minister of Andhra Pradesh
 Kasu Mahesh Reddy MLA of Gurazala (Assembly constituency)

Kotla family
Kotla Vijaya Bhaskara Reddy, Chief minister, Central Cabinet Minister
Kotla Jayasurya Prakasha Reddy, Lok Sabha of Kurnool & Central Minister
Kotla Sujathamma, MLA of Dhone

Kinjarapu family
Kinjarapu Yerran Naidu, Union Minister and MLA of Srikakulam assembly constituency
Kinjarapu Ram Mohan Naidu, MP, Srikakulam Lok Sabha constituency and son of Kinjarapu Yerran Naidu
 Aadireddy Bhavani, contested from Rajahmundy City assembly constituency in 2019 assembly elections of Andhra Pradesh and daughter of Kinjarapu Yerran Naidu and daughter-in-law of Aadireddy Appa Rao
Kinjarapu Atchannaidu, MLA, Tekkali assembly constituency and younger brother of Kinjarapu Yerran Naidu
Aadireddy Appa Rao, MLC

Kimidi family 
 Kalavenkatarao Kimidi  MLA & State Minister
 Kimidi Ganapathi Rao  MLA
 Kimidi Mrunalini  MLA & State Minister

Kethireddy family 
 Kethireddy Surya Pratap Reddy  MLA of Dharmavaram (Assembly constituency)
 Kethireddy Venkatarami Reddy  MLA of Dharmavaram (Assembly constituency)
 Kethireddy Peddareddy  MLA of Tadpatri (Assembly constituency)

Marri family 
Marri Chenna Reddy, former chief minister of Andhra Pradesh
Marri Shashidhar Reddy, MLA, Sanath Nagar

Mekapati family 
Mekapati Goutham Reddy, MLA & State Minister
Mekapati Rajamohan Reddy, MLA & Lok Sabha Member
Mekapati Chandrashekhar Reddy, MLA
Mekapati Vikram Reddy

Nandamuri–Nara family
N.T. Rama Rao, former chief minister of Andhra Pradesh
Nandamuri Harikrishna, former Rajya Sabha Member, former Transport Minister of undivided Andhra Pradesh
Nandamuri Balakrishna, incumbent Member of Andhra Pradesh State Assembly from Hindupur constituency
Daggubati Purandeswari, former member of Lok Sabha, former Union Minister of State, Human Resource Development, former Union Minister of State, Commerce and Industry.
Daggubati Venkateswara Rao, former Member of Andhra Pradesh State Assembly, former Member of Parliament, former Health Minister, former member of YSR Congress Party
N. Chandrababu Naidu, former chief minister of Andhra Pradesh and incumbent president of Telugu Desam Party
Nara Lokesh, former MLC Cabinet Minister for Panchayat Raj & IT, Andhra Pradesh
Nara Ramamurthy Naidu, former MLA from Chandragiri, brother of N. Chandrababu Naidu
Nandamuri Suhasini, incumbent vice president of Telugu Desam Party and lost in 2018 Telangana Legislative Assembly election from  Kukatpally Assembly constituency

P. V. family
P. V. Narasimha Rao, former prime minister of India
P. V. Ranga Rao, MLA & Minister of Andhra Pradesh 
P. V. Rajeshwar Rao, Member of Lok Sabha from Secunderabad 
Surabhi Vani Devi, MLC

Patnam family
P. Mahender Reddy, MLA & State Minister
Patnam Narender Reddy, MLA & MLC
Sunitha Mahender Reddy, ZP Chairman

P. J. R. family
P. Janardhan Reddy, MLA & Leader of opposition
P. Vishnuvardhan Reddy, MLA Jubilee Hills
P. Vijaya Reddy, GHMC Corporator

Paritala family
Paritala Ravindra, MLA from Penukonda assembly constituency
Paritala Sunitha, MLA from Raptadu assembly constituency and wife of Paritala Ravindra

Palavalasa family
Palavalasa Rajasekharam - MLA from Vunukuru
Palavalasa Vikranth - MLC
Reddy Shanthi - MLA from Pathapatnam

Pusapati family 
Pusapati Vijayarama Gajapati Raju - MLA & Lok Sabha Member
Pusapati Ashok Gajapathi Raju - MLA, State Minister , Lok Sabha Member & Central Minister
Pusapati Anandh Gajapathi Raju - MLA, State Minister & Lok Sabha Member
Uma Gajapathi Raju - Lok Sabha Member

Peddireddy family
P. V. Midhun Reddy - Lok Sabha Member and YCP Lok Sabha Floor Leader
Peddireddy Ramachandra Reddy - MLA & State Minister
Peddireddy DwarkanathReddy - MLA from Thamballapalle (Assembly constituency)
Peddireddy Aditya Pattabi - Related to Tamilnadu CM Korattur (Assembly constituency)

Rayapati family 
 Rayapati Sambasiva Rao Lok Sabha Member and Rajhya Sabha from Guntur & Narsaraopeta
 Rayapati Srinivas - MLC

Salar Jung

Tanguturi family
T. Anjaiah, CM of Andhra Pradesh
Tangaturi Manemma, wife of Anjaiah and Member of Lok Sabha from Secunderabad

Thangirala family
Thangirala Prabhakara Rao, MLA from Nandigama
Tangirala Sowmya, MLA from Nandigama

Ummareddy family
Ummareddy Venkateswarlu, MLA, MLC, Central Minister & Opposition Floor leader in Legislative Council
Kilari Venkata Rosaiah, MLA from Ponnur (Assembly constituency)

Vangaveeti family
 Vangaveeti Mohana Ranga MLA from Vijayawada East (Assembly constituency)
 Vangaveeti Radhakrishna, MLA from Vijayawada East (Assembly constituency)
 Vangaveeti Ratnakumari, MLA from Vijayawada East (Assembly constituency)
 Vangaveeti Shobanachalapathi Rao, MLA from Vuyyuru

Yeduguri Sandinti family
Y. S. Rajasekhara Reddy, former chief minister of Andhra Pradesh
Y. S. Vijayamma, Member of Legislative Assembly, Pulivendula, wife of Rajashekara Reddy
Y. S. Jagan Mohan Reddy, Chief Minister of Andhra Pradesh, Member of Parliament, Kadapa
Y. S. Avinash Reddy, Kadapa Lok Sabha Member
Y. S. Vivekananda Reddy, Kadapa Lok Sabha Member, MLA, MLC & State Minister
Y. V. Subba Reddy, Ongole Lok Sabha Member
Pochimareddy Ravindranath Reddy MLA from Kamalapuram (Assembly constituency)

YellaReddyGari family 
 Y Bheem Reddy - Member of Legislative Assembly from Uravakonda, Anantapur District, son-in-law of Rao Bahadur Badinehal Rangana Goud
 Y Sivarami Reddy - son of Y Bheem Reddy, Member of Legislative Council
 Y Bala Nagi Reddy - son of Y Bheem Reddy, Member of Legislative Assembly from Mantralayam constituency, Kurnool District
 Y Sai Prasad Reddy - son of Y Bheem Reddy, Member of Legislative Assembly from Adoni Constituency, Kurnool District
 Y Venkatram Reddy - son of Y Bheem Reddy, Member of Legislative Assembly from Guntakal constituency, Anantapur District
 Y Visweswara Reddy - son of Y Bheem Reddy, Member of Legislative Assembly from Uravakonda

References 

 
Andhra Pradesh and Telangana
Andhra Pradesh-related lists
Telangana-related lists
Telangana politicians
Telugu politicians